Glass animal collectibles are tiny blown glass animal figurines that serve as collectibles. It takes skill to make each individual one and each figurine has a different and unique color. To make glass animals requires a torch kit, a kiln, glass, and rods.

History 
Back in the 1860s carousel figurines spread to the United States. Dustav Dentzel started a company that made the parts. Art Nouveau is known for his cameo glass. He used the acid-cutting method to create his pieces. Ancient glassworkers would make vessels, vases, and eating utensils. The glass was decorated by adding molten colored glass drips to the final product. Glassblowing was introduced to shape the glass.

Cultural references 
In the play The Glass Menagerie by Tennessee Williams Laura has a small collection of animal glass figurines.

References 

Figurines
Glass art
Animals in art